Bound by Fire is the debut album by Canadian humorous metal band, Zimmers Hole (then spelt as Zimmer's Hole). This edition of the album may be out of print. Some copies (still sealed) surface on eBay quite often. It was later re-issued on Century Media Records with bonus tracks. Devin Townsend produced this CD underneath the alias "Dr.Skinny" (Also the name he uses for Punky Brüster)

Track listing
 Follow
 Blister
 Pork Rind Toes
 Two Headed Anal Baby
 P.B.C.
 Hell Comes to Breakfast
 Fully Packed
 Rent-a-Cop
 Bred
 This Is Metal
 Dis
 Waste of Towels
 Gospel Sodomy Boy on Blow
 Terry
 Bound by Fire

 Hidden Tracks: "S-26", "DOOOH!", and "Prick Pipe" appear (in order) after a long silence on track 15.

Re-issue
The re-issue of the Bound by Fire was released in 2003. It contained previously unreleased tracks. Tracks 16-18 were hidden tracks on the original copy. 'Bred' has been edited on the 2003 reissue version, with the band's take on Kiss' 'God Of Thunder' replaced with a newly recorded sketch about the C.D. sounding faulty, and how it will soon return to normal.

Track listing
 Follow
 Blister
 Pork Rind Toes
 Two Headed Anal Baby
 P.B.C.
 Hell Comes to Breakfast
 Fully Packed
 Rent-a-Cop
 Bred
 This Is Metal
 Dis
 Waste of Towels
 Gospel Sodomy Boy on Blow
 Terry
 Bound by Fire
 S-26
 DOOOH!
 Prick Pipe
 The Dark Church of Whatever (bonus track)
 Split Dick (bonus track)
 Buttbarf (bonus track)
 AC/GC (bonus track)
 Roast Chicken Monday (bonus track)
 Face Pisser (bonus track)
 Monkey Man (bonus track)
 What's That Stink? (bonus track)

Personnel 
Chris Valagao – vocals
Jed Simon – guitar
Byron Stroud – bass
Steve Wheeler – drums

Zimmers Hole albums
1999 albums
2003 albums
2008 albums
Albums produced by Devin Townsend